Steven Joseph Chiasson (April 14, 1967 – May 3, 1999) was a Canadian ice hockey defenceman with the National Hockey League's Detroit Red Wings, Calgary Flames, Hartford Whalers and Carolina Hurricanes.

Chiasson died in an automobile accident, while driving under the influence, on May 3, 1999.

NHL career
Chiasson was born in Barrie, Ontario, and raised in Peterborough, Ontario. As a youth, he played in the 1980 Quebec International Pee-Wee Hockey Tournament with a minor ice hockey team from Peterborough.

Drafted by the Detroit Red Wings in 1985, he was an offensive defenceman who displayed a lot of skill. During the 1992–93 NHL season Chiasson recorded a career-high 62 points and represented the Campbell Conference in the NHL All-Star Game. He was traded to the Calgary Flames in exchange for Mike Vernon in the 1994 off-season. Chiasson spent two and a half seasons with the Flames before being dealt to the Hartford Whalers in 1997 and continued with the team as they became the Carolina Hurricanes the following season. After spending most of the 1998–99 season on the injured list, Chiasson returned for the playoffs and scored a power play goal in Game 5 of their conference quarterfinal round with the Boston Bruins, which would end up being his last NHL goal.

Chiasson was also frequently a member of the Canadian national team, representing them in eight IIHF World Championships over the course of his career.

Fatal accident
On May 3, 1999, after the Hurricanes were eliminated from the playoffs in Boston and returned to Raleigh, Chiasson wrecked his pickup truck on the way home from a team party and was killed on impact. Chiasson was survived by his wife, Susan, and three young children: Michael, Ryan and Stephanie. There is a sculpture garden created in his honor with life-size bronze portraits of his children playing around a pond and a plaque in his memory in Millennium Park, Peterborough, Ontario, the town where he was raised. The Stanley Cup was brought to this spot on July 27, 2006, by former Flames teammate Cory Stillman, after Stillman won the Cup with the Hurricanes that season.

Legacy
After his death, the Carolina Hurricanes established the Steve Chiasson Award to honor the player who "best demonstrates leadership, perseverance, determination and dedication."

No player has ever worn #3 for the Hurricanes again, though it has not been officially retired.

Chiasson's older son, Michael played defence for the University of Michigan men's hockey team and wore his late father's #3. Chiasson's other son, Ryan, also wore #3 for the Dubuque Fighting Saints of the USHL during the 2013–2014 season.

Career statistics

Regular season and playoffs

International

See also
List of ice hockey players who died during their playing career

References

External links

AP story on accident/toxicology report

1967 births
1999 deaths
Adirondack Red Wings players
Calgary Flames players
Canadian ice hockey defencemen
Canadian people of Acadian descent
Carolina Hurricanes players
Detroit Red Wings draft picks
Detroit Red Wings players
Guelph Platers players
Hartford Whalers players
Sportspeople from Peterborough, Ontario
National Hockey League All-Stars
Road incident deaths in North Carolina
Sportspeople from Barrie
Ice hockey people from Simcoe County